Cnemotettix is a genus of silk-spinning crickets in the family Anostostomatidae. There are about five described species in Cnemotettix.

Species
These five species belong to the genus Cnemotettix:
 Cnemotettix bifasciatus Rentz & Weissman, 1973
 Cnemotettix caudulus Rentz & Weissman, 1973
 Cnemotettix miniatus Rentz & Weissman, 1973
 Cnemotettix pulvillifer Caudell, 1916
 Cnemotettix spinulus Rentz & Weissman, 1973

References

Further reading

 

Anostostomatidae
Ensifera genera
Articles created by Qbugbot